Microbunodon was a genus of extinct artiodactyl mammals in the family Anthracotheriidae. It lived between the upper Eocene and the lower Pliocene (about 35–5 million years ago). Its fossil remains have been found in Europe and Asia.

Description
Microbunodon, unlike most of its close relatives, was small in size and with a slight build. Its weight did not exceed 20–25 kilograms and the skull was about 20–30 centimeters long. Microbunodon was slim with long legs and a short snout with long prominent canine teeth in males, similar to a saber-toothed cat. It was characterized by a fused mandibular symphysis, with a ventral ridge-like prominence.

Classification
The genus Microbunodon was established by Deperet in 1908 to accommodate a species previously described by Georges Cuvier in 1822 and attributed to the genus Anthracotherium, as A. minimum, from the Oligocene superior of France. The type species, Microbunodon minimum, lived in the Oligocene in Europe and is known in France, Germany, Switzerland, Austria and Turkey. Other species attributed to this genus are M. silistrensis (early and middle Miocene, Indian subcontinent and Indochina) and M. milaensis (late Miocene and early Pliocene, Indian subcontinent and Indochina). Other fossils attributed to this genus come from the upper Eocene of China and testify to an exceptional longevity of this evolutionary line (Tsubamoto, 2010).

Microbunodon is an anthracothere, a group of artiodactyls usually considered similar to hippopotami. Microbunodon represents an aberrant morphology for this family, whose members usually have large, heavy shapes. Microbunodon and Anthracokeryx have been placed in a separate subfamily, Microbunodontinae.

Paleobiology
Analysis of dental wear of Microbunodon reveals that it probably had a diet based on leaves and fruit (Lihoreau, 2003). It likely lived in forest environments and had a lifestyle quite similar to that of musk deer and mouse deer.

It is likely that it originated in Asia in the Eocene. At the end of the Oligocene, Microbunodon migrated to Europe and spread rapidly, along with other Artiodactyls. This event is known as the Microbunodon event, due to the significant impact that the invasion of these animals had on European fauna of the period (Scherler et al., 2013; Mennecart, 2015).

References

Hünermann, K. A. von, 1967: Der Schädel von Microbunodon minus (Cuvier) (Artiodactyla, Anthracotheriidae) aus dem Chatt (Oligozän). Eclogue Geologicue Helvetica, vol. 60, p. 661–668.
Lihoreau, F., 2003. Systematique et paleoecologie des Anthracotheriidae (Artiodactyla; Suiformes) du Mio-Pliocene de l'Ancien Monde: Implications paleobiogeographiques. Unpublished These d'Universite, Universite de Poitiers
Lihoreau, F., Blondel, C., Barry, J. and Brunet, M., 2004: A new species of the genus Microbunodon (Anthracotheriidae, Artiodactyla) from the Miocene of Pakistan: genus revision, phylogenetic relationships and palaeobiogeography. Zoologica Scripta, vol. 33, p. 97–115.
T. Tsubamoto. 2010. Recognition of Microbunodon (Artiodactyla, Anthracotheriidae) from the Eocene of China. Paleontological Research 14(2):161-165
Takehisa Tsubamoto, Thaung-Htike, Zin-Maung-Maung-Thein, Naoko Egi, Yuichiro Nishioka, Maung-Maung, and Masanaru Takai. (2012) New Data on the Neogene Anthracotheres (Mammalia, Artiodactyla) from Central Myanmar. Journal of Vertebrate Paleontology 32:4, 956-964.
 Scherler L, Mennecart B, Hiard F, Becker D (2013) Evolution of terrestrial hoofed-mammals during the Oligocene-Miocene transition in Europe. Swiss Journal of Geosciences 106: 349–369. 
 Mennecart B (2015) The European Ruminants during the “Microbunodon Event” (MP28, Latest Oligocene): Impact of Climate Changes and Faunal Event on the Ruminant Evolution. PLoS ONE 10(2): e0116830. 

Anthracotheres
Oligocene even-toed ungulates
Eocene even-toed ungulates
Eocene genus first appearances
Chattian genus extinctions
Eocene mammals of Asia
Oligocene mammals of Asia
Oligocene mammals of Europe
Prehistoric even-toed ungulate genera